Mohamed Hamdy Mahmoud Sharaf Eldin (born 15 March 1995), is an Egyptian footballer who plays for Egyptian Premier League side Pyramids as a left-back.

Hamdy was promoted to Al Ahly's first team in late 2014. On 14 April 2015, he made his debut for the club in a 2014–15 Egyptian Premier League match against Al Assiouty Sport under Juan Carlos Garrido.

References

1995 births
Living people
Footballers from Cairo
Egyptian footballers
Association football fullbacks
Egyptian Premier League players
Al Ahly SC players
Al Mokawloon Al Arab SC players
Al Masry SC players
Pyramids FC players
Egypt youth international footballers